Stand-Up India was launched by the Government of India on 5 April 2016 to support entrepreneurship among women and SC & ST communities. 

It is similar to but distinct from Startup India. Both are enabler and beneficiary of other key Government of India schemes, such as Make in India, Industrial corridor, Dedicated Freight Corridor, Sagarmala, Bharatmala, UDAN-RCS, Digital India, BharatNet and UMANG.

History 
Prime Minister Narendra Modi launched the Stand-Up India scheme on 15 April 2016 as part of the government's efforts to support entrepreneurship among women and SC & ST communities.

The scheme 

See also 
 Khadi 
 Khadi and Village Industries Commission
 Ministry of Micro, Small and Medium Enterprises
 Mahatma Gandhi Institute for Rural Industrialization
 National Charkha Museum  
 National Handloom Day of India
 Make In India 
 Startup India
 Swadeshi Jagaran Manch
 Swaraj

References

External links 
 

Narendra Modi
2016 establishments in India